Scheduled Tribes (also known as "tribals" or "adibasi/ adivasi") refers to specific indigenous peoples whose status is acknowledged to some formal degree by national legislation. Scheduled tribes of the Indian state of West Bengal, as recognized by the Constitution of the Indian Republic; a total of 40 distinct tribes. Among those 40 tribes 3 tribes are "Particularly Vulnerable Tribal Groups" (PTGs).

Overview
As per 2001 census scheduled tribes numbering 4,406,794 persons constituted 5.5 per cent of the total population of the state. Santals constitute more than half (51.8 per cent).of the total ST population of the state. Oraons (14 per cent), Mundas (7.8 per cent), Bhumij (7.6 per cent) and Kora (3.2 per cent) are the other major STs having sizeable population. Along with Santal, they constitute nearly 85 per cent of the state's total ST population. The Lodhas, Mahalis, Bhutias, Bedias, and Savars are the remaining STs, and having population of one per cent or more as per 2001 census report. After 2002 the population of ST had increased due to addition of major groups Tamang & Limbu(Subba) has great significant number in the population.

Population and proportion of ten major STs in West Bengal, as per 2001 census, are given below:

More than half of the total ST population of the state is concentrated in Medinipur, Jalpaiguri, Purulia, and Bardhaman districts. Of the remaining districts, Bankura, Malda, Uttar Dinajpur, and Dakshin Dinajpur have sizable ST population.

List of tribes 
As per the Constitution (Scheduled Tribes) Order, 1950, the following were listed as scheduled tribes in West Bengal.

Asur 
Baiga
Badia, Bediya 
Bhumij
Bhutia, Sherpa, Toto, Dukpa, Kagatay, Tibetan, Yolmo
Birhor
Birjia
Chakma
Chero
Chik Baraik
Garo
Gond
Gorait
Hajong
Ho
Karmali
Kharwar
Khond
Kisan
Kora
Korwa
Lepcha
Limbu(Subba)
Lodha, Kheria, Kharia
Lohara, Lohra
Magh
Mahali
Mahli
Mal Pahariya
Mech
Mru
Munda
Nagesia
Oraon
Parhaiya
Rabha
Santal
Sauria paharia
Savars
Tamang

References

Scheduled Tribes of India